Fiction, often stylized as fiction (Chinese: 大/小說家) is Taiwanese Mandopop artist Yoga Lin's fourth Mandarin studio album. It was released on 22 June 2012 by HIM International Music. It was ranked #1 in Taipei Times's list of top five Mandarin albums of 2012. Yoga Lin co-produced most songs on the album, and participated in the writing of the lyrics and mixing of the songs.

Background
The concept of the album was to use music to tell a story, and each song on the album functions as a short story. The whole album becomes a ten song collection of short stories in a multitude of genres as science fiction, romance, horror, allegory, and so on. Songs like "说谎 (Fairytale)", "心酸 (Heartbreak)" and "早开的晚霞 (Early Sunset Clouds)" from earlier albums made him famous, which all conveys Yoga Lin's characteristic melancholic sound. Yoga Lin and his producers agreed that for the fourth album they wanted to try something different to record a more powerful performance, as well as showcase his talents in various styles of music.

Track listing

Music videos
 Lure (誘) (30/05/2012)  
 Fools' Bliss (勉強幸福) (18/06/2012)  
 Romeo and Juliet Syndrome (越反越愛) (27/06/2012) 
 Runaway Mama (28/08/2012) 
 Unrequited (浪費) (19/12/2012) 
 Vulure (拾荒) (20/12/2012)

References 

Yoga Lin albums
2012 albums